The Canadian Geotechnical Journal has been published since 1963 by NRC Research Press. It is a monthly journal featuring papers related to geotechnical and geoenvironmental engineering as well as applied sciences. Papers are loaded to the Web site in advance of the printed issues. The editor in chief is Craig Lake. The Canadian Geotechnical Society has chosen the Canadian Geotechnical Journal as its principal medium of publication of geotechnical, geological, hydrogeological, cold regions geotechnical, and geoenvironmental papers.

References

External links 
 
 The Canadian Geotechnical Society

Canadian Science Publishing academic journals
Monthly journals
English-language journals
Publications established in 1963
Geology journals
Engineering journals
Academic journals associated with learned and professional societies of Canada